Siegfried Creek is a stream in Clearwater County, Minnesota, in the United States.

Siegfried Creek was named for A. H. Siegfried, a newspaper agent from Louisville, Kentucky, who made a vacation to some lakes in the area in 1879.

See also
List of rivers of Minnesota

References

Rivers of Clearwater County, Minnesota
Rivers of Minnesota